Too Many Millions is a lost 1918 American silent comedy film directed by James Cruze and written by Gardner Hunting based upon the novel by Porter Emerson Browne. The film stars Wallace Reid, Ora Carew, Tully Marshall, Charles Ogle, James Neill, and Winifred Greenwood. The film was released on December 8, 1918, by Paramount Pictures.

Plot
As described in a film magazine, the Bass brothers (Beery and Williams) are unscrupulous misers while Artemus Wilkins (Marshall) is their confidential bookkeeper. The brothers are afraid that young Walsingham Van Doren (Reid), their nephew, will squander their ill-gotten gains, and on the day they propose to execute a will that will cut him off without a cent, they are both killed in an accident. Van Doren, who previously sold books door-to-door for a living, proceeds to have a good time with the $40 million left by his uncles. At an expensive New York hotel he takes a suite of rooms where he wines and dines to his hearts content, the only annoyance being having to sign for the foreclosing of mortgages that the faithful Wilkins brings. Finally Van Doren gives Wilkins a power of attorney to sign everything and the next thing he knows is that Wilkins has turned everything into cash and skipped town. He learns of his plight as Desiree Lane (Carew), whose home he has acquired as a result of foreclosing a mortgage, is demanding the return of securities belonging to her father. The two start in search of Wilkins. They are driven from a New England cottage one night by a fire and then decide to get married. They settle in the little town and are happy when Wilkins bursts in on them to return the stolen money. The film ends with an intertitle asking "Mr. Audience, what would you do?"

Cast
Wallace Reid as Walsingham Van Doren
Ora Carew as Desiree Lane
Tully Marshall as Artemus Wilkins
Charles Ogle as Garage Keeper
James Neill as Mr. Lane
Winifred Greenwood as Waitress
Noah Beery, Sr. as R.A. Bass
Percy G. Williams as B.A. Bass
Ernest Pasque as Beverwyck
Richard Wayne as Second Friend

References

External links 

 
 
Browne, Porter Emerson (1917), Someone and Somebody, Indianapolis: Bobbs-Merrill and Company, on the Internet Archive

1918 films
1910s English-language films
Silent American comedy films
1918 comedy films
Paramount Pictures films
Films directed by James Cruze
American black-and-white films
American silent feature films
Lost American films
1918 lost films
Lost comedy films
1910s American films